The following lists events that happened during 1964 in New Zealand.

Population
 Estimated population as of 31 December: 2,617,000
 Increase since 31 December 1963: 50,100 (1.95%)
 Males per 100 females: 100.8

Incumbents

Regal and viceregal
Head of State – Elizabeth II
Governor-General – Brigadier Sir Bernard Fergusson GCMG GCVO DSO OBE.

Government
The 34th New Zealand Parliament commenced, with the second National Government in power.

Speaker of the House – Ronald Algie  .
Prime Minister – Keith Holyoake
Deputy Prime Minister – Jack Marshall.
Minister of Finance – Harry Lake.
Minister of Foreign Affairs – Keith Holyoake.
Attorney-General – Ralph Hanan.
Chief Justice — Sir Harold Barrowclough

Parliamentary opposition 
 Leader of the Opposition –   Walter Nash (Labour) until 31 March, then  Arnold Nordmeyer (Labour).

Main centre leaders
Mayor of Auckland – Dove-Myer Robinson
Mayor of Hamilton – Denis Rogers
Mayor of Wellington – Frank Kitts
Mayor of Christchurch – George Manning
Mayor of Dunedin – Stuart Sidey

Events 

 27 February – the  Lyttelton road tunnel, at the time New Zealand's longest road tunnel, opens to traffic.
 1 April – The Government unveils plans for the new executive wing of Parliament, demolishing Government House and constructing a "beehive"-shaped building in its place.
 21–27 June – The Beatles tour New Zealand.
 November – The Continental Shelf Act 1964 passes into law.

Arts and literature
Maurice Gee wins the Robert Burns Fellowship.

See 1964 in art, 1964 in literature

New books
Washday at the Pa
See :Category:1964 books

Music
See 1964 in music
21–27 June: The Beatles tour New Zealand.

Radio and television
Coronation Street was shown for the first time on New Zealand television on AKTV2 in the Auckland region on Thursday 14 May, running from 8.25 pm to 8.52 pm. As television was not then networked throughout New Zealand, Wellington (WNTV1), Christchurch (CHTV3) and Dunedin (DNTV2) followed in June and July; on Tuesday in Wellington and Christchurch and Thursday in Dunedin.
Television licences reach 168,000.
Broadcast relay stations at Mount Erin, Kuriwao Hill and Mount Hedgehope are commissioned, extending television coverage to Hawke's Bay, South Otago and Southland.
A Māori broadcasting section of NZBC is established.
NZBC begins plans for the Avalon studios. 
New Zealand Television Workshop awards:
Best Factual: Focus
Best Light Entertainment: Music Hall
Best Documentary: The Distant Shore

See: 1964 in television, List of TVNZ television programming, :Category:Television in New Zealand, :Category:New Zealand television shows, Public broadcasting in New Zealand.

Film
Runaway

See: :Category:1964 film awards, 1964 in film, List of New Zealand feature films, Cinema of New Zealand, :Category:1964 films

Sport

Athletics
 Peter Snell – Olympic Gold Medal, Men's 800 metres
 Peter Snell – Olympic Gold Medal, Men's 1500 metres
 John Davies – Olympic Bronze Medal, Men's 1500 metres
 Marise Chamberlain – Olympic Bronze Medal, Women's 800 metres
 Ray Puckett wins his fourth national title in the men's marathon, clocking 2:17:38.6 on 7 March in Lower Hutt.

Chess
 The 71st National Chess Championship was held in Auckland, and was won by R.A. Court of Wellington.

Cricket
 New Zealand cricket team
 Plunket Shield was won by Auckland (1963-1964 season)

Horse racing

Harness racing
 New Zealand Trotting Cup – Cairnbrae
 Auckland Trotting Cup – Lordship

Lawn bowls
The national outdoor lawn bowls championships are held in Dunedin.
 Men's singles champion – Ron Buchan (Tui Park Bowling Club)
 Men's pair champions – W.D. Scott, G.P. Ogilvie (skip) (Cromwell Bowling Club)
 Men's fours champions – C.T. Bateman, J.M. Clarke, R.D. Barron, H. Deavoll (skip) (Sydenham Bowling Club)

Netball
 Silver Ferns

Olympic Games

Summer Olympics

 New Zealand sends a team of 64 competitors.

Winter Olympics
 New Zealand does not participate in the 1964 Winter Olympics.

Rugby league
 New Zealand national rugby league team
 Rugby League World Cup

Rugby Union
 :Category:All Blacks
 Bledisloe Cup: New Zealand beat Australia by 2 tests to 1
 Ranfurly Shield: Taranaki was successful in all defences, with 8 wins and 1 draw.

Soccer
 The Chatham Cup is won by Mount Roskill who beat King Edward Technical College Old Boys 3–1 in the final.
 Provincial league champions:
	Auckland:	Blockhouse Bay
	Bay of Plenty:	Kahukura
	Buller:	Waimangaroa United
	Canterbury:	Christchurch City
	Franklin:	Papatoetoe
	Hawke's Bay:	Napier Rovers
	Manawatu:	Thistle
	Marlborough:	Woodbourne
	Nelson:	Rangers
	Northland:	Otangarei United
	Otago:	Northern AFC
	Poverty Bay:	Eastern Union
	South Canterbury:	West End
	Southland:	Invercargill Thistle
	Taranaki:	Moturoa, Old Boys (shared)
	Waikato:	Hamilton
	Wairarapa:	YMCA
	Wanganui:	Wanganui United
	Wellington:	Diamond
	West Coast:	Grey United

Yachting
 Helmer Pedersen, and Earle Wells – Olympic Gold Medal, Men's Flying Dutchman class

Births
 10 February: John Campbell, broadcaster
 22 February: Brad McGann, filmmaker (died 2007)
 1 March: Anne Judkins, race walker
 23 March: John Mitchell, rugby player and coach
 7 April: Russell Crowe, actor
 12 May: Matthew Palmer, legal academic
 24 May: Aaron Craig, 
 27 May: Joel Hayward, strategic studies scholar and poet
 10 June: 
Andrew Niccol, film director
Tony Martin, comedian.
 12 June: Lorraine Downes, beauty queen
 18 June: Simon Dallow, newsreader
 19 June: Michael Kenny, heavyweight boxer
 20 June: Steve Braunias, journalist
 July: Shayne Carter, musician
 11 August: Grant Waite, golfer
 27 August: Lynley Hannen, rower
 3 October: Shane Cotton, painter
 23 October: David Penfold, field hockey player
 29 October: Anthony Mosse, swimmer.
 3 November: Bryan Young, cricketer
 5 December: Brent Todd, rugby league footballer
 14 December: Rebecca Gibney, actress
 16 December: John Kirwan, rugby footballer and coach
 24 December: Nick Smith, politician
 Unknown: 
Martin Devlin, sports broadcaster
Glenn Colquhoun, poet

Deaths
 10 June : Harold Caro, Mayor of Hamilton.
 12 December: John Norman Massey, MP and politician.

See also
List of years in New Zealand
Timeline of New Zealand history
History of New Zealand
Military history of New Zealand
Timeline of the New Zealand environment
Timeline of New Zealand's links with Antarctica

References

External links

 
New Zealand
Years of the 20th century in New Zealand